Tuen Mun Road is a major expressway in Hong Kong which connects Tuen Mun with Tsuen Wan, within the New Territories. It is part of Hong Kong's Route 9, which circumnavigates the New Territories. Opened in 1978, it was once the major trunk route linking the northwest New Territories to urban Kowloon and is known for its frequent traffic jams and road accidents owing to its early design and heavy usage. As a result, speed limits have been enforced to  due to geometric constraints.

Alignment

The highway leads off Yuen Long Highway at Lam Tei Interchange, where it also interchanges with Castle Peak Road and Tsing Lun Road. The next section (considered from west to east) is a dual 3 lane road through the town centre of Tuen Mun, but this section is not a statutorily designated (limited-access) expressway.

Expressway regulations apply from the junction with Wong Chu Road, where it widens to 3 lanes and climbs the hillside beside Sam Shing Hui. It then descends into So Kwun Wat, crossing the rural area on an embankment. The road then rises again before descending into Siu Lam Interchange, where it interchanges with Castle Peak Road.

From here, the highway crosses the mouth of Tai Lam Chung, and starts climbing the hillsides of Tai Lam through split level terraces (the lower one being the Tuen Mun bound carriageway). The two carriageways join before bypassing the village of Tsing Lung Tau to the north. This section of road is constructed upon various deep cuttings and high embankments. Afterwards, the road crosses over the village of Sham Tseng (situated in a valley) to Sham Tseng Interchange, where it interchanges once again with Castle Peak Road.

The road then climbs towards Ting Kau Interchange with its widest section (5+3 lanes). After this junction with Tsing Long Highway, the Highway crosses the valley of Ting Kau with various viaducts, with the Tsuen Wan bound carriageway climbing to meet the split level section into Tsuen Wan. This section is characterised by its tight bends and steep descent eastbound. The two carriageways join as the highway terminates and leads into Cheung Pei Shan Road, with slip roads connecting with Tsuen Wan Road and Castle Peak Road (Tsuen Wan Section).

Interchanges

History and development
Tuen Mun Road was one of Hong Kong's first high speed roads, and the first expressway. Its construction proved to be a great challenge for the engineers. The road had to be built along the winding coastline, and the steep terrain encountered required the construction of numerous viaducts, culverts and cuttings. Another such measure was putting the construction work into phases.

Phase 1 of the road was built in 1977, being the present day Tsuen Wan bound carriageway. This section was officially opened on 5 May 1978 by Governor Murray MacLehose. Phase 2, which consists of the Tuen Mun bound carriageway between Sham Tseng and Tsuen Wan, was opened in 1981; the remaining Tuen Mun Bound carriageway was completed in 1983.

Since the road was opened, there have been various improvements carried out to meet the increasing traffic demand, such as the addition of uphill crawler lanes (Tsuen Wan Bound) at Sam Shing Hui, So Kwun Wat, Tai Lam Chung and Ting Kau. The Highways Department has plans to carry out extensive reconstruction works on Tuen Mun Road that will include widening traffic lanes, improving horizontal curvatures and sightlines, and the installation of noise barriers. These works commenced in October 2008 and completed at the end of 2015.

Tuen Mun Road remains one of the most heavily used roads in Hong Kong, as some drivers heading to Yuen Long shunpike Tai Lam Tunnel, and container trucks use it to access the River Trade Terminal in Tuen Mun.

To enhance the convenience of communicators travelling from New Territories to Kowloon or Hong Kong Island, Tuen Mun Road Bus-Bus Interchange had been under construction since 15 July 2010. The interchange on Kowloon bound side and that on Tuen Mun bound side were commissioned on 26 December 2012 and 27 July 2013 respectively.

Major incidents

Bus accident near Ting Kau

In the morning of 10 July 2003, a Neoplan Centroliner bus was running on route 265M of Kowloon Motor Bus (KMB) towards Tin Shui Wai, Yuen Long. A lorry running in the middle lane lost control as the bus approached the junction with Tsing Long Highway. The two vehicles collided, knocking the bus towards the side of the viaduct.

Rescue operations were described as being the most challenging encountered by the fire services since the fire at Garley Building. This was due to the constraints at the site (a rural village sited on a steep hillside with no direct road access), and the sheer volume of severely wounded casualties.

The bus was later lifted back onto Tuen Mun Road and transported to the vehicle compound at Siu Ho Wan. It was however written off.

After the incident, then-Chief Executive Tung Chee Hwa visited the crash scene and pledged that the government would do all that it could to aid the survivors, to investigate the accident and prevent similar accidents from ever happening again.

The lorry driver was sentenced to 18 months in jail after being found guilty of causing death by dangerous driving. At the time, it was the most serious road accident in Hong Kong history. He later appealed the rulings, which were subsequently overturned. Tests have shown that the vehicle he was driving was defective (tending to veer to the side when braking), and he was then found guilty of a lesser charge, careless driving, and his sentence was shortened to five months and a two-year driving ban.

Tyre burst incident near Yau Kom Tau
On 1 December 2013, a screw that protruded out of the road surface caused the tyres of about 50 heavy vehicles, of which 36 were KMB buses, to burst. The incident caused a 3-hour traffic jam and a partial closure of the road. Hundreds of passengers were affected but no one was injured in the incident.

See also
 List of streets and roads in Hong Kong

References

External links

 Google Maps of Tuen Mun Road

1978 establishments in Hong Kong
2003 road incidents
2003 in Hong Kong
Expressways in Hong Kong
Route 9 (Hong Kong)
Extra areas operated by NT taxis
Transport infrastructure completed in 1978
Roads in the New Territories